Yang Xiaodu (born 26 October 1953) is a Chinese politician who served as the first director of the National Supervisory Commission from 2018 to 2023. He served as a member of the 19th Politburo of the Chinese Communist Party from 2017 to 2022. From 2014 to 2022, he served as a Deputy Secretary of the Central Commission for Discipline Inspection (CCDI), the leading anti-graft body of the Chinese Communist Party. He has served in Shanghai and Tibet during his early political career.

Biography 
Yang was born in Shanghai in 1953. In 1970, during the Cultural Revolution, he was sent-down youth performing manual labour in Taihe County, Anhui province. In September 1973, he began studying at the Shanghai University of Traditional Chinese Medicine. He graduated in 1976 and then began working in Nagqu Prefecture, Tibet for a drug company. In 1984, he was named party secretary of Nagqu Hospital. In September 1986, Yang was named deputy commissioner (vice mayor equivalent) of Nagqu. In December 1992, he was named deputy party secretary of Chamdo Prefecture.

In 1995, he was named head of the finance department of Tibet Autonomous Region. In May 1998, he became Vice-Chairman of Tibet Autonomous Region, ascending to sub-provincial rank for the first time. In 2001, he returned to his native Shanghai and became vice mayor. He studied legal theory at the Central Party School while holding a job in Tibet.

In October 2006, he was named a member of the municipal Party standing committee of Shanghai and head of the municipal United Front Department; in May 2012, he was named head of the Shanghai Discipline Inspection Commission. In November 2013, having reached retirement age for sub-provincial level officials, he was named head of the 3rd Inspection Team, in charge of anti-corruption work at the Ministry of Land and Resources. In January 2014, he was elected Deputy Secretary of the Central Commission for Discipline Inspection.

On December 25, 2016, Yang was named Minister of Supervision, the eighth and oldest person to serve in the position since the founding of the People's Republic. 

On March 18, 2018, Yang was elected as the inaugural Director of the National Supervisory Commission.

Yang is a member of the 19th Politburo of the Chinese Communist Party and the 19th Central Commission for Discipline Inspection.

References 

People's Republic of China politicians from Shanghai
1953 births
Chinese Communist Party politicians from Shanghai
Living people
Members of the 19th Politburo of the Chinese Communist Party
Political office-holders in Shanghai
Political office-holders in Tibet
Nagqu
Chamdo